Estelle is a female given name of Occitan origin, and means star.

Saint Estelle was a martyr who purportedly lived in Aquitania in the third century AD, although the earliest references to her date from the Middle Ages. The earliest formats of this Saint's name, Eustella/Eustelle and Eustalia, morphed into Estelle by Provençal poet Frédéric Mistral due to association with Estela (Occitan for star, of which Estelle is essentially a phonetic rendering in French). Saint Estelle is the patron saint of the Felibrige, a literary and cultural association founded by Mistral and other Provençal writers to defend and promote their language.

Star is the meaning generally assigned the name Estelle, although the format Eustalia suggests the name's true root is the Greek eustales: well-groomed. Despite the reported popularity of the saint  the name Estelle was afforded little evident usage prior to the publication in 1788 of the pastoral Estelle by Jean-Pierre Claris de Florian, the first famous historical namesake, Estelle Fornier (née Dubœuf), muse of the composer Berlioz, who was born in 1797. Best-known overall in France due to model Estelle Lefébure (born 1966), the name Estelle has proven substantially more popular in Belgium than France.

Estelle came into vogue in the British Isles in the mid-19th century likely as a variant of the similar Stella which had recently become fashionable. Estelle was also promoted via utilization by a number of novelists who wrote in English, most notably Charles Dickens in variant form for the character Estella Havisham in his novel Great Expectations published in August 1861 after being serialized weekly from December 1860 with Estella being introduced in Chapter 8 on 19 January 1861. The general scholarly consensus is that in choosing Estella as the name of the remote love object of his novel's focal character: Pip - whose full given name is Philip - , Dickens was evoking Sir Philip Sidney's poetic wooing of the unattainable Stella in Astrophel and Stella (1591).

 

 
Several other widely read authors of the day gave the name Estelle to major characters in their novels, Catherine Gore in Romances of Real Life as early as 1829 although most examples date from mid-century, such as Annie Edwards in Creeds (1859), E.D.E.N. Southworth in The Lady of the Isle (1859), and Augusta Jane Evans in St. Elmo (1866).

Estelle and Estella remained popular from roughly 1880 to 1930, with a marked decline in usage since 1960. Estelle has overall been more popular in the United States than in the British Isles, with there being at least two prominent American namesakes: writer Estelle Anna Lewis (1824–1880)  and society woman Estelle Skidmore Doremus (1830–1905), who significantly predate the name's mid-19th century British vogue (although in Lewis' case it is dubious if Estelle were her birth name rather than a literary affectation).

Estelle is also used as an alternative form of Esther.

The name Estelle made headlines in February 2012 when King Carl Gustaf of Sweden announced Estelle as the given name chosen for his newborn granddaughter (see Princess Estelle, Duchess of Östergötland). The choice of a French name with only a peripheral profile in Sweden - a 2012 year-end tally would estimate that a total of 663 Swedish residents bore the given name Estelle  - touched off a flurry of media debate with writer Herman Lindqvist, who has acted as a historical consultant to the Swedish Royal Family, expressing the extreme negative position thus: "Totally unexpected and inappropriate...No name for a future ruler...Estelle sounds like the name of a nightclub queen." Conversely top Scandinavian royalty pundit Kjell Arne Totland (no) reacted positively, calling Estelle "a very nice name, rich in tradition yet modern."

People with the name Estelle
 Princess Estelle, Duchess of Östergötland, Princess of Sweden
 Estelle Akofio-Sowah, Scottish-born Ghanaian businesswoman
 Estelle Alphand (born 1995), Swedish-French alpine skier
 Estelle Mendell Amory (1845–?), American educator and author
 Estelle Asmodelle, Australian transsexual model, dancer and actress
 Estelle Axton (1918–2004), American record executive 
 Estelle Bajou, American actor, composer, musician, producer, and writer
 Estelle Balet, Swiss champion snowboarder
 Estelle Baskerville (born 1946), American athlete
 Estelle Basor, American mathematician
 Estelle Beauchamp, Canadian educator and writer
 Estelle Beere (1875–1959), New Zealand dancing teacher
 Estelle Bennett, American singer (the Ronettes)
 Estelle Bernadotte (1904–1984), Countess of Wisborg
 Estelle Blackburn, award-winning Australian journalist
 Estelle Brody (1900–1995), American actress
 Estelle Cascarino (born 1997), French football player
 Estelle Chen, French model of Chinese descent
 Estelle Bee Dagum, Argentine and Canadian economist and statistician
 Estelle Denis (born 1976), French journalist and television presenter
 Estelle Desanges (born 1977), stage name of a French pornographic actress
 Estelle Elizabeth (born 1996), French ice dancer
 Estelle Etterre (1899–1996), American actress
 Estelle Evans (1906–1985), Bahamian-American actress
 Estelle Freedman, American feminist scholar
 Estelle Getty (1923–2008), American actress; star of The Golden Girls
 Estelle Grelier (born 1973), French politician
 Estelle Griswold (1900–1981), American civil rights activist and feminist 
 Estelle Harman (1922–1995), American acting coach
 Estelle Harris, (1928–2022) American actress - Estelle Costanza in Seinfeld
 Estelle Hemsley (1887–1968), African American actress of stage and screen
 Estelle May Hurll (1863–1924), American writer
 Estelle Ishigo (1899–1990), American water color artist
 Estelle Muriel Kerr (1879–1971), Canadian painter, illustrator and writer
 Estelle Klein (1930–2004), advocate and supporter of folk music in Canada
 Estelle Kohler (born 1940), British theatre and television actress
 Estelle Lawson (1907–1983), American amateur golfer
 Estelle Lawton Lindsey, American journalist
 Estelle Lazer, Australian archaeologist 
 Estelle Lefébure, French model
 Estelle Anna Lewis (1824–1880) American poet and dramatist
 Estelle Liebling, American vocal coach
 Estelle M. H. Merrill (1858–1908), American journalist, editor
 Estelle Nze Minko (born 1991), French handball player
 Estelle Morris Baroness Morris of Yardley, British politician
 Estelle Mossely (born 1992), French boxer
 Estelle Massey Osborne (1901–1981), African American nurse and educator
 Estelle Nathan, British painter
 Estelle Nollet (born 1977), French writer
 Estelle Parsons (born 1927), American actress
 Estelle Perrossier (born 1990), French sprinter
 Estelle Quérard (born 1979), French volleyball player
 Estelle Ramey (1917–2006), American endocrinologist, physiologist and feminist
 Estelle Reiner (1914–2008), American actress and singer
 Estelle Ricketts (born 1871), American composer
 Estelle Roberts (1889–1970), British spiritualist medium
 Estelle Sapir, Polish Jewish Holocaust survivor and litigant
 Estelle Sartini (born 1973), French rugby player
 Estelle Skornik (born 1971), French actress
 Estelle Swaray (born 1980), British singer/rapper
 Estelle Turrell Smith (born 1854), social reformer
 Estelle Taylor, American silent movie actress
 Estelle Thomson (1894–1953), Australian naturalist and botanical artist
 Estelle Thompson, Australian crime writer
 Estelle Weigel (1914–1967), American figure skater
 Estelle Winwood, British character actress
 Estelle Yancey (1896–1986), American blues singer

See also
 Estella (disambiguation)
 Esther (given name)
 Stella (given name)

References

English feminine given names
Occitan language